Alyssa McClelland (born 1981) is an Australian director, writer and actress.

Early life and education
McClelland was educated at Newtown High School of the Performing Arts in Sydney and was Dux in her final year. She attended the University of Technology Sydney where she earned a B.A. in Communication in Media Arts and Production, majoring in film. From the age of fifteen she trained and performed in productions with the Australian Theatre for Young People in Sydney until she received a scholarship that enabled her to study abroad with the Atlantic Theater Company in New York.

Career
McClelland's most recent short film Second Best won the Dendy Live Action Short Award at the Sydney Film Festival, the Australian Directors' Guild Award for Best Direction in a short film, Best Short Film at the Milano Film Festival, Best Foreign Film at Lake Shorts Film Festival, the Youth Award at 20MinMax Film Festival and Best Direction at Flickerfest </ref>. McClelland directed, wrote and produced the cult hit web series One Step Closer to Home seasons 1 and 2 and the short film Nic and Shauna which was a finalist in Tropfest, the world's largest short film festival. McClelland is a respected international commercial director, having won awards such as the Black Pencil at the D&AD Awards and Best Direction in the London International Awards. She was the recipient of the InStyle Magazine Woman of Style Scholarship for her work as a Filmmaker in Australia.

As an actor, McClelland received an Australian Film Institute Award nomination for Best Guest or Supporting Actress in Television for her role in the Network Ten telemovie Small Claims. She has had lead roles in the feature films A Man's Gotta Do, The Bet, Deck Dogz and in Australian television series Rake, Home and Away, Dance Academy and Canal Road McClelland has performed leading roles in productions with the Sydney Theatre Company, Melbourne Theatre Company, and Belvoir St Theatre in Sydney. She is a former Jan Logan star, face of the annual campaign, along with other Jan Logan ambassadors Rose Byrne, Elizabeth Debicki, and Teresa Palmer.

References

External links 

1981 births
Australian film actresses
Australian television actresses
Australian stage actresses
Living people
People educated at Newtown High School of the Performing Arts
University of Technology Sydney alumni